Mafia is a series of action-adventure games originally created and developed by 2K Czech (formerly Illusion Softworks). Since the third installment, however, the games are developed by Hangar 13 and published by 2K Games. The franchise consists of three mainline installments, along with a remake of the first game, a remastered version of the second game, and two spin-offs for mobile devices. A fourth game is in active development.

Games in the Mafia series are set in fictional locales modeled after real American cities, and typically feature historical settings, from Great Depression-era Lost Heaven in the first game, to 1960s New Bordeaux in Mafia III. Gameplay focuses on an open world environment where players complete missions to progress an overall story, as well as engage in various side activities, albeit in a more linear manner than other open world series such as Grand Theft Auto. However, most of the games include a bonus Free Ride mode, which allows players to trigger missions from the open world. The series centers on different protagonists who become involved with the Mafia in one way or another, either attempting to rise through its ranks or bring it down for wronging them. The antagonists are commonly characters who have betrayed the protagonist or their organisation, or characters who have the most impact impeding the protagonist's progress.

All games in the franchise have been well received by critics, with praise for their complex narratives, open world design, and focus on realism, although Mafia III reviewed significantly worse than the others due to its repetitive gameplay structure. The Mafia series has also been commercially successful, with combined lifetime sales of over 17 million units.

Games

Mafia (2002) 

The first game in the series, Mafia (known during pre-release as Mafia: The City of Lost Heaven), was developed by Illusion Softworks and published by Gathering of Developers for Microsoft Windows in August 2002. It was later ported to the PlayStation 2 and Xbox in February 2004 and March 2004, respectively. Set in the fictional city of Lost Heaven, loosely based on Chicago, from 1930 to 1938, the game follows Tommy Angelo, a taxi driver-turned-mobster, and his rise and fall within the Salieri crime family.

Mafia: Definitive Edition (2020) 

Mafia: Definitive Edition is a remake of the original Mafia game, developed by Hangar 13 and published by 2K Games for Windows, PlayStation 4, and Xbox One in September 2020. The remake builds upon the gameplay systems introduced in Mafia III while adding several new features, such as the introduction of motorcycles to the series, and closely follows the plot of the original, with several alterations, mainly to dialogue and locations.

Mafia II (2010) 

Mafia II is the standalone sequel to Mafia and was developed by 2K Czech and published by 2K Games for Windows, PlayStation 3, and Xbox 360 in August 2010. A Mac OS X version was also released in December 2011. The game is set in the fictional metropolis of Empire Bay, inspired by several American cities but primarily by New York, from 1945 to 1951. It tells the story of Vito Scaletta, a young Sicilian-American criminal and World War II veteran, who becomes caught in a power struggle among Empire Bay's various Mafia families while attempting to pay back his late father's debts and secure a better lifestyle.

Downloadable content 
On May 26, 2010, ahead of the game's release, four content packs were announced as pre-order bonuses in America and Europe, each one available through different retailers. The Vegas Pack containing two additional cars and suits for Vito and the War Hero Pack containing two military-style vehicles and suits were available from GameStop and EBGames. The Renegade Pack containing two sports cars and two jackets was available from Amazon and the Greaser Pack featuring two hot rods and two suits was available to Best Buy customers. All pre-order packs were available for purchase as game add-ons on the PlayStation Network, Xbox Live, and Steam.

Following Mafia II's release, 2K Games supported the game with three major downloadable content (DLC) packs. The first, titled The Betrayal of Jimmy, was initially released as a PlayStation 3 exclusive, and features a new storyline starring the titular Jimmy, a gun-for-hire who works for various criminal outfits in Empire Bay. The second pack, titled Jimmy's Vendetta, was released in September 2010 and is a continuation of Jimmy's story, while the third, titled Joe's Adventures, was released in November 2010 and follows Vito's best friend Joe Barbaro during the missing chapters of Mafia II's story.

A version of Mafia II containing the base game and all DLC packs, titled Mafia II: Director's Cut, was released by Feral Interactive in December 2011.

Mafia III (2016) 

Mafia III was developed by Hangar 13 and published by 2K Games for Windows, PlayStation 4, and Xbox One in October 2016. It was later released for macOS in May 2017, and for Google Stadia in October 2021. Set within the fictional city of New Bordeaux, based on New Orleans, in 1968, the game follows former criminal and Vietnam veteran Lincoln Clay, who is forced to return to a life of crime to help his adoptive family settle problems with the local branch of the Mafia. After the Mafia betray and murder his family, Lincoln embarks on a quest for revenge while slowly building a criminal empire and seizing power from other criminal organisations in the city.

Downloadable content 
Similarly to Mafia II, 2K Games released three story-driven DLC packs for Mafia III. The first, titled Faster, Baby!, was released in March 2017; it introduces the town of Sinclair Parish, located on the outskirts of New Bordeaux, and follows Lincoln's efforts to expose the corruption of its racist sheriff, Walter Beaumont, with the help of civil rights activist Charles Laveau and his daughter Roxy. The second, titled Stones Unturned, was released in May 2017, and sees Lincoln and his friend John Donovan teaming up to stop former CIA agent and Donovan's nemesis Connor Aldridge, who stole a nuclear bomb in hopes of ending the Vietnam War. The final DLC, titled Sign of the Times, was released in July 2017, and follows Lincoln's investigation of a satanic cult called the Ensanglante.

A version of Mafia III containing the base game and all three DLC packs, titled Mafia III: Definitive Edition, was released in May 2020, and later included in the Mafia: Trilogy collection.

Other games 
To coincide with the release of Mafia II, a mobile version was developed by Twistbox Games and published by Oasys Mobile; the iOS version was published by Connect2Media. However, the game is not a direct adaptation of Mafia II, and instead serves as a prequel that bridges the gap between the first two Mafia games. The story follows Marco Russotto, a soldato in the Salieri crime family and the nephew of the family's gunsmith Vincenzo, who travels to Empire Bay to find and kill Tommy Angelo as revenge for his betrayal of the family. The game features two possible endings, but only one is canon and leads into the events of Mafia II.

A mobile role-playing game titled Mafia III: Rivals was released to tie-in with the main game, developed by Cat Daddy Games for Android and iOS. Rivals is presented as a role-playing game with turn-based combat mechanics. A free demo of Mafia III was released on March 28, 2017, the same day as the first downloadable content pack of the game.

A fourth installment is currently in development.

Compilations and remasters 
A remastered version of Mafia II and all its DLC packs, titled Mafia II: Definitive Edition, was released in May 2020, at the same time as the Definitive Edition of Mafia III. Both games were later included in the Mafia: Trilogy pack, which also contains Mafia: Definitive Edition (the remake of the first Mafia game) and was released alongside it in September 2020.

Common elements

Gameplay
Each game in the Mafia series allows the player to take on the role of a criminal in a large city, typically an individual who plans to rise through the ranks of organised crime. The player character is given various missions by friends and mafia figures in the city underworld which must be completed to progress through the storyline.

The use of vehicles in an explorable urban environment provides a basic simulation of a working city, complete with pedestrians who generally obey traffic signals. Further details are used to flesh out an open-ended atmosphere that has been used in several other games. Traffic rules and regulations are stringently and realistically enforced in the games; failure to obey them through speeding or reckless driving are usually met with penalties such as citations, with further violations resulting in efforts by law enforcement to retaliate more aggressively and thus incapacitate the player.

Setting
Games in the Mafia series are set in fictional locales modeled after American cities, at various points in time during the 20th century, when the American Mafia was the height of its power.

Mafia is set in Lost Heaven during the 1930s. Lost Heaven is loosely based on New York City, Chicago and San Francisco. Mafia II is set in the 1940s and early 1950s in Empire Bay, which is based on New York, Chicago, San Francisco, Los Angeles, Boston and Detroit. Mafia III is set in the late 1960s in New Bordeaux, a fictionalised version of New Orleans.

Characters

Note: A gray cell indicates character does not appear in that medium.

Reception

The first two games in the series, have received generally positive reviews, while the third game received mixed reviews. The series have been praised for their narratives, with the first installment particularly praised for its realism in its gameplay. However, Mafia II was criticized for its linear open-world design, and Mafia III was criticized for its repetitive gameplay and technical issues. 

Mafia: Trilogy, which collects Mafia: Definitive Edition, the 2020 remake of the first Mafia, as well as the Definitive Editions of Mafia II and Mafia III, generated lifetime sales of more than 2 million units by November 2020.

Controversies 

Mafia II has generated some controversy following its release. Sonia Alfano, a member of the European Parliament and president of Italy's association for the families of Mafia victims and whose father was murdered by the Mafia, called for the game to be banned. Take-Two Interactive responded to the issue, stating that the game's depiction of the American Mafia was no different from organized crime films such as The Godfather. They also responded to allegations of racism from Unico National, who claimed that the game portrayed Italian-Americans unfairly and "indoctrinating" youth into violent stereotypes.

Mafia II also used to hold the record for most profanity used in a video game, particularly with regards to the word fuck, which appears more than 200 times, beating out previous record holder The House of the Dead: Overkill. However, it was beaten in 2013 by Grand Theft Auto V, in which the word fuck is either spoken or read in excess of 1,000 times.

References

External links
Official website

 
2K Czech games
2K Games franchises
Action-adventure games
Gangs in fiction
Obscenity controversies in video games
Open-world video games
Organized crime video games
Take-Two Interactive franchises
Take-Two Interactive games
Third-person shooters
Video game controversies
Video game franchises introduced in 2002
Video game franchises
Video games developed in the Czech Republic
Works about the American Mafia